The Public Defender of Georgia, an ombudsman, is an institution that oversees the observance of human rights and freedoms in Georgia. It advises the government on human rights issues. It also analyses the nation's laws, policies, and practices, in compliance with the international standards, and provides relevant recommendations.

The Public Defender of Georgia is elected for a term of six years, for no more than one consecutive term, by a majority of at least 3/5 of the total number of the members of the Parliament of Georgia. The office was established in accordance with the 1996 Organic Law on the Public Defender of Georgia. Any obstruction of the activities of the Public Defender is punishable by law. The Constitution of Georgia grants certain immunity to the Public Defender; they can be arrested only with the consent of Parliament, except if caught at the crime scene.

The public defender of Georgia took a proactive approach to the issue of torture, which used to be widespread in Georgia's police stations, leading to a dramatic reduction in its occurrence in the mid-2000s. Aspects of its program that were deemed effective in reducing torture include accepting anonymous complaints and commonly making surprise visits to places of detention.

List of Public Defenders of Georgia 
 Davit Saralidze (დავით სალარიძე), 27 October 1997 – 1 September 2000
 Nana Devdariani (ნანა დევდარიანი), 1 September 2000 – 1 September 2003
 Temur Lomsadze (თემურ ლომსაძე; acting), 1 September 2003 – 16 September 2004
 Sozar Subari (სოზარ სუბარი), 16 September 2004 – 17 September 2009
 Giorgi Tugushi (გიორგი ტუღუში), 17 September 2009 – 20 September 2012
 Ucha Nanuashvili (უჩა ნანუაშვილი), 7 December 2012 – 30 November 2017
 Nino Lomjaria (ნინო ლომჯარია), 30 November 2017 – 8 December 2022
 Tamar Gvaramadze (თამარ გვარამაძე; acting), 8 December 2022 – 7 March 2023
 Levan Ioseliani (ლევან იოსელიანი), 7 March 2023 – present

References 

Ombudsman posts
Human rights in Georgia (country)
Political office-holders in Georgia (country)
1996 establishments in Georgia (country)
Government agencies established in 1996